is a Japanese screenwriter and novelist born in Shiga. He has written scripts  for Sailor Moon, Neon Genesis Evangelion, Revolutionary Girl Utena, FLCL, RahXephon, Melody of Oblivion, Ouran High School Host Club, Nodame Cantabile, Redline, Star Driver, Captain Earth, Bungo Stray Dogs, and The Dragon Dentist. He has also written a three volume novelization of FLCL, which was released in the United States by Tokyopop from 2008 to 2009. Prior to becoming a scriptwriter, he was an employee at Nippon Telenet Corporation which focused on MSX personal computer communication services.

References

External links 

 Yoji Enokido anime at Media Arts Database 

1963 births
Anime screenwriters
Living people
Japanese screenwriters